Vijay Arora (27 December 1944 – 2 February 2007) was an Indian actor in Hindi films and television serials who was known for Yaadon Ki Baaraat and as Indrajit in the television serial Ramayan.

Career

He also appeared in the series Bharat Ek Khoj, directed by Shyam Benegal as Prince Salim/Emperor Jahangir. He also played various characters in Ramanand Sagar's successful serial Vikram Aur Betal.

In 2001, he was seen in two serials, Lakeerein and Talaash, and Ketan Mehta's Pradhan Mantri. He acted in Jaana Na Dil Se Door, directed by Vijay Anand. Arora appeared in Gujarati cinema in films like Raja Harish Chandra, with Madhuri Dixit. He had acted in several Hindi and Gujarati plays. He did over 110 films and over 500 broadcast television serial episodes.

Personal life

Arora was married to ex-model and Miss India, Dilber Debara, and they have a son Farhad. Arora died on 2 February 2007 at his residence, due to a stomach ailment.

Filmography

Television

References

External links

1944 births
2007 deaths
Indian filmmakers
Film and Television Institute of India alumni
Indian male film actors
Punjabi people
Male actors in Hindi cinema
Indian male television actors
21st-century Indian male actors